Patrice Toye (born Ghent, 1967) is a Belgian film director. Her 1998 film Rosie was selected as the Belgian entry for the Best Foreign Language Film at the 71st Academy Awards, but was not nominated.

Filmography

Short films
 Vrouwen willen trouwen (1992)

Feature films
 Rosie (1998)
 Nowhere Man (2008)
 Little Black Spiders (2012)
 Tench (2019)

References

External links
 

1967 births
Living people
Belgian film directors
Place of birth missing (living people)
Magritte Award winners